Los Pozos Airport  is an airport serving the city of San Gil in the Santander Department of Colombia.

See also

Transport in Colombia
List of airports in Colombia

References

External links
OpenStreetMap - San Gil
OurAirports - San Gil
San Gil Airport

Airports in Colombia